Bad Blood is the second and final album by Ice. The album is most notable for its fusion of industrial music and hip hop, as well as the number of guests on the album.

Track listing
"X-1" – 7:13
Vocals – Blixa Bargeld, Sebastian Laws
"The Snakepit" – 5:54
Scratches – DJ Vadim
Vocals – Blixa Bargeld, Toastie Taylor
"Trapped in Three Dimensions" – 7:38
Vocals: A-Syde, El-P
"Dusted" – 6:53
Vocals: Sebastian Laws, Sensational
"A New Breed of Rat" – 11:55
Vocals: Blixa Bargeld
"Devils" – 7:04
"When Two Worlds Collide" – 7:09
Scratches - DJ Vadim
Vocals - Blixa Bargeld, Priest, Sebastian Laws

Personnel 
Ice
Kevin Martin – Vocals, Saxophone, Synthesizer, Turntables
Justin Broadrick – Guitar
Dave Cochrane – Bass
Lou Ciccotelli – Drums, Percussion
Additional personnel
Scott Harding - Drum Loops, Samples
Alex Buess - Engineering
Simon Heyworth - Mastering

References

1998 albums
Ice (band) albums
Reprise Records albums